Adolf Hitler, as Führer and Reich Chancellor and Supreme Commander of the Armed Forces of Nazi Germany, employed a personal staff, which represented different branches and offices throughout his political career. He maintained a group of aides-de-camp and adjutants, including Martin Bormann's younger brother Albert in the National Socialist Motor Corps (NSKK), Friedrich Hoßbach of the Wehrmacht, who was sacked for unfavourable conduct, and Fritz Darges of the Schutzstaffel (SS), who was also dismissed for inappropriate behaviour. Originally an SS adjutant, Otto Günsche was posted on the Eastern Front from August 1943 to February 1944, and in France until March 1944, until he was appointed as one of Hitler's personal adjutants.

Others included valets Hans Hermann Junge, Karl Wilhelm Krause, and his longest serving valet, Heinz Linge. They accompanied him on his travels and were in charge of Hitler's daily routine; including awaking him, providing newspapers and messages, determining the daily menu/meals and wardrobe. He employed four chauffeurs over the years, including the part-Jewish Emil Maurice, and founding member of the Sturmabteilung (SA), Julius Schreck. Women in his employ included secretaries Christa Schroeder, his chief and longest serving one Johanna Wolf, and his youngest, Traudl Junge. Hitler disliked change in personnel and liked to have people around him that he was used to and who knew his habits. Hitler's personal staff members were in daily contact with him and many were present during his final days in the Führerbunker at the end of World War II in Europe.

Staff

Footnotes

See also

 List of books by or about Adolf Hitler
 List of books about Nazi Germany

References

Citations

Bibliography

Online
 
 

 
Adolf Hitler's personal staff